Ansalonga is a village in Andorra, located in the parish of Ordino in the north of the country.

Populated places in Andorra
Ordino